Empty Hills House, Pustye Kholmy or Pustye Holmy was a non-commercial open-air alternative arts and music festival in Russia.

The festival was held annually since 2003, usually over several days in June, in Kaluga Oblast or Smolensk Oblast. It was a non-profit event with no admission fee or sponsorship. The efforts of volunteers were responsible for the production of the event. 

Unlike most music festivals, Empty Hills had no specific musical format or style. Among genres represented on the festival, there were folk music, blues, rock music, reggae, sometimes electronic music, jazz or avant-garde.

Event history

References

External links 
 Official site 
 Official site (English version)

Music festivals in Russia
Folk festivals in Russia
Music festivals established in 2003